Al-Hasan Stadium is a multi-purpose stadium in Irbid, Jordan, located next to Irbid's Yarmouk University. It is currently used mostly for football matches. The stadium holds 12,000 people.

References

Football venues in Jordan
Multi-purpose stadiums in Jordan
Sport in Irbid